Sulen is an isolated mountain peak in Sandaun Province, Papua New Guinea. It is the highest  peak in Torricelli Mountains.

References

Sulen